The 1982–83 Magyar Kupa (English: Hungarian Cup) was the 43rd season of Hungary's annual knock-out cup football competition.

Final

See also
 1982–83 Nemzeti Bajnokság I

References

External links
 Official site 
 soccerway.com

1982–83 in Hungarian football
1982–83 domestic association football cups
1982-83